Government Postgraduate College Jhang is a government college located in Jhang, Pakistan. The college is affiliated with the University of the Punjab.

History
Government Postgraduate College Jhang was established in 1926.

Alumni
 Abdus Salam, a Nobel laureate in Physics
 Har Gobind Khorana, a Nobel laureate in Physiology or Medicine
 Majeed Amjad, poet and journalist
 Mahmood Shaam, poet and writer
 Wazir Agha, critic of Urdu language

References 

Universities and colleges in Jhang District
University of the Punjab
Educational institutions established in 1926
1926 establishments in British India